Elizabeth Little (born 3 October 1960) is an Australian former professional tennis player.  She competed three times at the Australian Open, once at Wimbledon, and once at the U.S. Open.

Little is the mother of professional tennis players John Peers and Sally Peers.

External links
 
 

1960 births
Australian female tennis players
Living people
Place of birth missing (living people)
Australian Open (tennis) junior champions
Grand Slam (tennis) champions in girls' singles